Prescott Lee is a technology industry executive who co-founded the company FilmLoop along with Kyle Mashima.  Lee previously founded and built the online company eCircles.com with Nathanael "Joe" Hayashi, which they subsequently sold to the firm Classmates.com.

Notes 

American businesspeople
Living people
Year of birth missing (living people)
Place of birth missing (living people)